The 2007–08 Barys Astana season was the 8th season in the Kazakhstan Hockey Championship and their single season in the Supreme League of the Russian Ice Hockey Championship, in parallel.

Kazakhstan Hockey Championship

Standings

Schedule and results

|-  style="text-align:center; background:#d0e7ff;"
| 1 || May 1 || Gornyak Rudny || 3-2 (SO) || Alexei Kuznetsov || Kazakhstan Sports Palace, Astana || 0-0-1-0 || 2 || 
|-  style="text-align:center; background:#cfc;"
| 2 || May 2 || Yertis Pavlodar || 6-2 || Alexei Kuznetsov || Kazakhstan Sports Palace, Astana || 1-0-1-0 ||   5 || 
|-  style="text-align:center; background:#cfc;"
| 3 || May 4 || Saryarka Karagandy || 5-2 || Alexei Kuznetsov || Kazakhstan Sports Palace, Astana || 2-0-1-0 || 8 || 
|-  style="text-align:center; background:#cfc;"
| 4 || May 6 || Kazzinc-Torpedo || 4-1 || Alexei Kuznetsov || Kazakhstan Sports Palace, Astana || 3-0-1-0 || 11 || 
|-  style="text-align:center; background:#cfc;"
| 5 || May 7 || Kazakhmys Satpaev || 6-2 || Alexei Kuznetsov || Kazakhstan Sports Palace, Astana || 4-0-1-0 || 14 || 
|-

|-
|

References

Barys Astana seasons
Barys